Paul Gratzik (30 November 1935 – 18 June 2018) was a German dramatist and novelist. He came to wider public attention in 2011 as the subject of the documentary film Vaterlandsverräter (English translation: Enemy of the State) by Annekatrin Hendel about his past as a Stasi informer.

Life
Paul Gratzik was born in Lindenhof, near Lötzen in East Prussia (modern Poland), the third of six children of a farm worker. His father fell in the first days of the Second World War. Early in 1945 he, his mother, and siblings fled westwards in an ox cart, ending up in Schönberg in Mecklenburg, in what would become East Germany. After completing compulsory education he undertook a carpentry apprenticeship from 1952 to 1954, and then did manual work in the Ruhr, in Berlin, in Weimar, and later in the brown coal open-cast mine in Schlabendorf in the Lausitz. In Berlin he tried to complete his Abitur at evening classes.

In Weimar, in 1962, he was an official in the local Free German Youth and decided to collaborate with the Ministry for State Security (MfS or Stasi) as an informer.  He also began to write.

From 1963 to 1968 he studied at the Weimar teacher training institute (:de:Institut für Lehrerbildung). His first play was published in 1966. In 1968 he enrolled at the "Johannes R. Brecher" Institute for Literature at Leipzig University, a creative writing school, but after a short time, by almost unanimous vote of faculty and students, he was expelled. He then taught at a children's home in Dönschten in the Osterzgebirge.

In 1971, he began to work full-time as a writer and joined the GDR writer's guild (Deutscher Schriftstellerverband). But in 1974 he began again to work in industry, part-time, at the Dresden transformer factory. From 1977, Gratzik lived in Berlin, employed as playwright by the Berliner Ensemble. He was awarded the Heinrich Mann Prize in 1980.

In 1981, he refused all further cooperation with the MfS and confessed to his friends, amongst them Heiner Müller, that he had informed on them. He was no longer allowed to publish, and many friends shunned him.  From 1984, he became an object of observation by the Stasi and experienced harassment by them.

Since the middle of the 1980s, he lived in seclusion in the Uckermark, between Templin and Prenzlau.

Paul Gratzik's work reflects his own experiences as a manual worker under East German socialism. Although a convinced communist, his unadorned realism, and readiness to tackle taboo themes, for example the East German juvenile re-education establishments (Jugendwerkhöfe), brought him into conflict with the censors. In GDR literary circles he was, as a worker who wrote, already unusual, but his gregariousness, charisma, and magnetic effect on women, made him one of the most colourful figures.

Neither the British Library nor the German National Library list any English translations of his work.

Works
(This list is taken from with some publication data added from the German Wikipedia article Paul Gratzik)
  1965. Unruhige Tage. (Play). Leipzig: Zentralhaus für Kulturarbeit 1966
  1968. Malwa. (Play after Maxim Gorki). Frankfurt am Main: Verlag der Autoren 1978
  1969. Warten auf Maria. (Play).
  1970. Umwege. Bilder aus dem Leben des jungen Motorenschlossers Michael Runna. (Play). Berlin: Henschelverlag 1970
  1971. Der Kniebist. (Play). Hans Otto Theater, Potsdam 1971
  1975. Märchen von einem, der auszog das Fürchten zu lernen. (Play).
  1976. Lisa. Zwei Szenen. (Play). Frankfurt am Main: Verlag der Autoren 1979
  1976. Handbetrieb. (Play).
  1977. Paul Gratzik - Stücke. (Collected plays). Rostock: Hinstorff 1977
  1977. Transportpaule. Monolog. (Novel). Rostock: Hinstorff 1977; Berlin: Rotbuch 1977
  1980. Tschekisten. (Play).
  1982. Kohlenkutte. (Novel). Berlin: Rotbuch 1982; Rostock: Hinstorff 1989
  1984. Die Axt im Haus. (Play)
  1988. Gabis Ort. (Novel, unpublished)
  1994. Hans Wurst in Mogadischu. (Play) 
  1996. Tripolis. (Story, filmed as Landleben)
  1997. Litauische Claviere. (Play after Bobrowski). , Berlin 1997
  1999. Simplizissimus. (Play after Grimmelshausen). Theater 89, Berlin 1999
  2010. Der Führergeburtstag. (Play)

Vaterlandsverräter film
Vaterlandsverräter is a 97-minute documentary film about Paul Gratzik directed by the German film maker , who had known Gratzik for twenty years before making the film. It premiered at the Berlinale in 2011. In 2012 it was broadcast by Arte, and in 2013 awarded a Grimme-Preis in the Information category: 

Die Zeit, amongst others, also praised the film: 

The DVD of Vaterlandsverräter has English subtitles.

Annekatrin Hendel
 
 
 
 
 
 James Cleverley. Memories of the GDR (Ph.D. Thesis)

References

External links
 Film official site 'Enemy of the State'
 

1935 births
2018 deaths
20th-century German male writers
20th-century German novelists
East German writers
German male novelists
Heinrich Mann Prize winners
People from East Prussia
People from Giżycko County
People of the Stasi